Erich Bornberg-Bauer (born 1963 in Vienna) is an Austrian biochemist, theoretical biologist and bioinformatician.

Life 
Bornberg-Bauer, studied biochemistry, physics and mathematics (1981–1991) at the University of Vienna and obtained a diploma in biochemistry (1992, University of Vienna). He performed his doctoral research on evolutionary fitness landscapes of RNA and proteins in the group of  Peter Schuster, Institute of Theoretical Chemistry, University of Vienna, and received his Ph.D in 1995. He continued his academic career at the University of Vienna (Institute of Mathematics) as a university assistant (equivalent to assistant professor; 1994 – 1996). Thereafter, he worked at the Deutsche Krebsforschungszentrum in Heidelberg as a postdoctoral researcher in the group of Martin Vingron on algorithms for sequence analysis (1996–1998), and subsequently as a project leader at EML (European Media Laboratory) GmbH (1998 – 2000; this department is now a part of Heidelberg Institute for Theoretical Studies). Since 2000, Bornberg-Bauer has been working as an independent academic researcher, first as a senior lecturer in bioinformatics at the University of Manchester (2000–2003), and then as a professor of Molecular Evolution and Bioinformatics at the Institute for Evolution and Biodiversity, University of Münster (2003 – present). Since 2018, he is a guest scientist at the Max Planck Institute for Biology in Tübingen. He has been a guest professor at Claude Bernard University Lyon 1 and a visiting scholar at European Bioinformatics Institute.

Research 

Bornberg-Bauer's earlier research focused on the aspects of RNA and protein evolution, especially on the phenomenon of neutral evolution, evolvability and robustness. Together with Hue Sun Chan (University of Toronto), he developed the concept of superfunnels on neutral networks, which describes how populations of functional polymers (such as proteins) randomly explore the sequence space to find transition sequences (switches) to new networks. His work also showed that errors in a protein's sequence that arise during translation (phenotypic mutations), help to explore the sequence space more rapidly. This phenomenon, termed as the look ahead effect, dramatically increases the probability of a gene to acquire beneficial double mutations. His research group at the University of Münster has been working on three main research topics. First is (since 2005) modular evolution of proteins, which involves understanding of how protein domains can reshuffle to create new proteins with altered functions. The second topic is about a phenomenon known as de novo gene birth by which new protein coding genes emerge from DNA segments in an organism's genome, that do not contain any genes. The third topic is genomic analysis of the evolution of eusociality in insects. Bornberg-Bauer has been involved in the initial genome sequencing and annotation of Eucalyptus grandis, Nasonia vitripennis, Nasonia giraulti, Nasonia longicornis, Zostera marina, Bombus terrestris, Bombus impatiens, Atta cephalotes, Blattella germanica and Cryptotermes secundus

His earlier work and most research projects from his group, primarily involve bioinformatics and computational biology. Recent projects form his group have coupled theoretical findings with experiments to understand the molecular evolution of promiscuous (multifunctional) enzymes, and the properties of proteins that emerge de novo. Bornberg-Bauer's work has been supported by the German Research Foundation, the Volkswagen Foundation, the European Commission, and three research grants from the Human Frontier Science Program in 2006, 2013, and 2018, among others. Since 2021, Bornberg-Bauer is leading the research priority program, "The Genomic Basis of Evolutionary Innovations (GEvol)" of the German Research Foundation He has been Editor-in-chief of Bioinformatics and Biology Insights since 2009 and is editorial member of the Journal of the Royal Society Interface, BMC Evolutionary Biology and the Journal of Experimental Zoology.

Publications 
Erich Bornberg-Bauer has published more than 150 scientific articles and book chapters.

Scientific articles
 Erich Bornberg-Bauer Publication list (University of Münster: Bornberglab)

Selected publications
 Eicholt, LA, Aubel, M, Berk, K, Bornberg-Bauer, E, Lange, A. Heterologous expression of naturally evolved putative de novo proteins with chaperones. Protein Science. 2022; 31( 8):e4371. 
 Lange, A., Patel, P.H., Heames, B. et al. Structural and functional characterization of a putative de novo gene in Drosophila. Nature Communications 12, 1667 (2021). 
 N. Terrapon, C. Li, H. M. Robertson, L. Ji, X. Meng, W. Booth, Z. Chen, C. P. Childers, K. M. Glastad, K. Gokhale, J. Gowin, W. Gronenberg, R. A. Hermansen, H. Hu, B. G. Hunt, A. K. Huylmans, S. M. Khalil, R. D. Mitchell, M. C. Munoz-Torres, J. A. Mustard, H. Pan, J. T. Reese, M. E. Scharf, F. Sun, H. Vogel, J. Xiao, W. Yang, Z. Yang, Z. Yang, J. Zhou, J. Zhu, C. S. Brent, C. G. Elsik, M. A. Goodisman, D. A. Liberles, R. M. Roe, E. L. Vargo, A. Vilcinskas, J. Wang, E. Bornberg-Bauer, J. Korb, G. Zhang, J. Liebig: Molecular traces of alternative social organization in a termite genome. In: Nature Communications. Band 5, Mai 2014, S. 3636, PMID 24845553.
 M. C. Harrison, E. Jongepier, H. M. Robertson, N. Arning, T. Bitard-Feildel, H. Chao, C. P. Childers, H. Dinh, H. Doddapaneni, S. Dugan, J. Gowin, C. Greiner, Y. Han, H. Hu, D. S. Hughes, A. K. Huylmans, C. Kemena, L. P. Kremer, S. L. Lee, A. Lopez-Ezquerra, L. Mallet, J. M. Monroy-Kuhn, A. Moser, S. C. Murali, D. M. Muzny, S. Otani, M. D. Piulachs, M. Poelchau, J. Qu, F. Schaub, A. Wada-Katsumata, K. C. Worley, Q. Xie, G. Ylla, M. Poulsen, R. A. Gibbs, C. Schal, S. Richards, X. Belles, J. Korb, E. Bornberg-Bauer: Hemimetabolous genomes reveal molecular basis of termite eusociality. In: Nature Ecology and Evolution. Band 2, Nummer 3, März 2018, S. 557–566, PMID 29403074.
 T. Sikosek, H. S. Chan, E. Bornberg-Bauer: Escape from Adaptive Conflict follows from weak functional trade-offs and mutational robustness. In: Proceedings of the National Academy of Sciences. Band 109, Nummer 37, September 2012, S. 14888–14893, PMID 22927372, .
 E. Bornberg-Bauer, H. S. Chan: Modeling evolutionary landscapes: mutational stability, topology, and superfunnels in sequence space. In: Proceedings of the National Academy of Sciences. Band 96, Nummer 19, September 1999, S. 10689–10694, PMID 10485887, .
 A. D. Moore, E. Bornberg-Bauer: The dynamics and evolutionary potential of domain loss and emergence. In: Molecular biology and evolution. Band 29, Nummer 2, Februar 2012, S. 787–796, PMID 22016574, .
 J. Weiner, F. Beaussart, E. Bornberg-Bauer: Domain deletions and substitutions in the modular protein evolution. In: The FEBS journal. Band 273, Nummer 9, Mai 2006, S. 2037–2047, PMID 16640566.
 D. J. Whitehead, C. O. Wilke, D. Vernazobres, E. Bornberg-Bauer: The look-ahead effect of phenotypic mutations. In: Biology direct. Band 3, Mai 2008, S. 18, PMID 18479505, .
 L. Wissler, J. Gadau, D. F. Simola, M. Helmkampf, E. Bornberg-Bauer: Mechanisms and dynamics of orphan gene emergence in insect genomes. In: Genome biology and evolution. Band 5, Nummer 2, 2013, S. 439–455, PMID 23348040, .
 Olsen, J., Rouzé, P., Verhelst, B. et al. The genome of the seagrass Zostera marina reveals angiosperm adaptation to the sea. Nature 530, 331–335 (2016). 
 Sadd, B.M., Barribeau, S.M., Bloch, G. et al. The genomes of two key bumblebee species with primitive eusocial organization. Genome Biology 16, 76 (2015). 
 Myburg, A., Grattapaglia, D., Tuskan, G. et al. The genome of Eucalyptus grandis. Nature 510, 356–362 (2014).

External links 
 Website of Erich Bornberg-Bauer
 Google Scholar Profile
 ORCiD
 Bakterium verändert Spermien von Insekten (Spiegel Online)
 A Surprise Source of Life's Code (Scientific American)
 Land plant became key marine species(Science Daily)
 The Elusive Calculus of Insect Altruism (Scientific American)
 Consider the Cockroach (Inside Science)
 The social evolution of termites (Science Daily)

References 

1963 births
Living people
Austrian biochemists
Austrian biologists